The Darjah Utama Yang Amat Mulia Bintang Sarawak (Most Exalted Order of the Star of Sarawak) is the highest state order in the state of Sarawak. It is conferred to those who rendered excellent service towards the development of the state of Sarawak and Malaysia. The Order was established in 1964, a year after Sarawak's independence with the formation of Malaysia. The history of the order can be traced back to 1928, where a similar order named Order of the Star of Sarawak was established by the White Rajahs. However, the revived order has no connection with the previous order, except for the similarity of the name of the order. The motto of the Order is based on the state motto and the current one was adopted in 1988. The design of the order ribbon was changed twice, first in 1973 and again in 1988. The design follows the colors of the Sarawakian flag: blue, red and white (1973 design), and yellow, black and red (1988 design). Both the Officer of the Star of Sarawak (JBS) and Officer of the Star of Hornbill Sarawak (JBS) share the same necklace design.

Recipients

Satria Bintang Sarawak (S.B.S.) 

Recipients of the Knight Grand Commander of the Most Exalted Order of the Star of Sarawak include:

2003

2017

Panglima Negara Bintang Sarawak (P.N.B.S.) 

Recipients of the Knight Commander of the Most Exalted Order of the Star of Sarawak (P.N.B.S.) also receive the title "Dato Sri". They include:

2002

2003

2005

2006

2007

2008

2009

2010

2011

2012

2013

2014

2015

2016

2017

2018

2019

Panglima Setia Bintang Sarawak (P.S.B.S.) 

Recipients of the Commander of the Most Exalted Order of the Star of Sarawak (P.S.B.S.) include:-
 The Late Dato Dr Judson Sakai Tagal - 2004 (Posthumous)
 Dato Zakaria Jaffar - 2004
 Dato Che Min Che Ahmad - 2004
 Dato Henry Lau Lee Kong - 2004
 Dato Hussain Paris - 2004
 Dato Vincent G. Chapman - 2004
 Dato Ursula Goh, Co-Founder, Sarawak Federation of Women's Institute - 2004
 Dato Dr. James Dawos Mamit - 2006
 Datin Amar Dato Dayang Morliah Awang Daud, Wife of the Sarawak Minister of Public Utilities - 2009
 Dato William Wei How Sieng, Advisor, HWS Properties Sdn. Bhd. - 2009
 Dato Sarbanun Abdul Kadir Marican, veteran artist - 2009
 Dato Dr Abu Bakar Abdullah @ Tom Belarek, president, Sarawak Orang Ulu Association - 2009
 Dato Mohamad Ramji Alli, Elections Commission - 2009
 Dato Bujang Tun Ahmad Zaidi Adruce, businessman - 2009
 The Rev'd Dato Pastor Dr Su Chii Ann, religious leader and president, Sarawak Chinese Annual Conference (SCAC) - 2009
 Dato Paul Teo Choo Tee - 2009
 Yang Arif Dato Rhodzariah Bujang, High Court judge - 2011
 Professor Dato Dr Jamil Hamali, Universiti Teknologi Mara Sarawak Rector - 2011
 Dato Mohammad Medan Abdullah, Senior General Manager, Group Corporate Affairs, Petronas - 2011
 Dato Janet Lau Ung Mie, Women's Wing Chief, Sarawak United Peoples' Party (SUPP) Bahagian Sibu Division - 2011
 Dato Dr Liew Wee Lik, pakar bedah kardiotorasik, Normah Medical Specialist Centre - 2011
 Dato Alexander Maiyor, president, Miri Melanau Association - 2011
 Dato Mohamad Sait Ahmad, Chief Executive Officer/Managing Director, Inland Revenue Board - 2011
 Dato Wan Morshidi Tuanku Abdul Rahman, president, Miri Malay Association- 2011
 Dato Usop Wahap @ Sani Wahap, former State Assembly Member (ADUN) for Lambir - 2011
 Dato Ir. Abang Jemat Abang Bujang, chief executive officer, Sacofa Sdn Bhd - 2011
 Dato Haji Abang Haji Talhata bin Haji Abang Hazemi, former director, Sarawak Prisons Department - 2011
 Dato Koh Yaw Hui - 2011
 Dato Rugayah Abdul Majid - 2011
 Seyed Ali Dabier Moghaddam - 2011 (Honorary)
 James Chan Khay Syn, 4th Mayor of Council of the City of Kuching South - 2012
 Dato Temenggong Vincent Lau - 2015
 Datuk Paduka Muhammad Juanda Abdul Rashid - 2015 (Honorary)
 Brig. Gen. (R) Dato Muhammad Daniel Damian Abdullah, Commander, Brigade 9 Infantry (Brigade 9) - 2017
 Dato Haji Ahmad Lai bin Bujang, Member of Parliament for P218 Sibuti - 2017
 Dato Dr Yao Sik Chii, former Sarawak Director of Health - 2017
 Dato Rabiah Johari, Member of the State Public Service Commission - 2017
 Dato Sharkawi Alis - 2017
 Dato Alex Ting Kuang Kuo - 2017
 Temenggong Dato Helmi Mohd Gol - 2017
 Dato Bernard Agan Assan - 2017
 Dato Goh Leng Chua - 2017
 Dato Yepni @ Yet Adenan - 2017
 Sgt. (Rtd) Dato Awang anak Raweng, GC, former Iban Scout with the 10th Platoon, Company D, Worcestershire Regiment Battalion 1 - 2018
Dato Yong Piaw Soon, group managing director of Harbour-Link Group Bhd  - 2018
Dato Tan Jit Kee, managing director of Hong Seng Construction (E.M.) Sdn. Bhd. and President of the Kuching Chinese General Chamber of Commerce and Industry - 2018
Dato Chieng Buong Toon, Deputy President II, Sarawak United Peoples' Party (SUPP) - 2018
Dato Marcus Leong, conductor, Simfoni Orkestra Negeri Sarawak (SONS) - 2018
Dato Musa Giri - 2018
Dato Dr Munirah Mohd Hassan - 2018 
Ustaz Dato Ismawi Duet, Sarawak Islamic Religious Council - 2018
Ustaz Dato Mustapha Kamal Ahmad Fauzi, Grand Imam of the State of Sarawak - 2018
Dato Hj. Sulaiman Hj. Narawi, former secretary, Sarawak Public Service Commission, and former Member of the Elections Commission - 2018
Dato Janang Bungsu, managing director of Konsortium Bumi Consultants and Services Sdn Bhd - 2018
Dato Philimon Nuing, Walikota of the Kapit District Council - 2018

Johan Bintang Sarawak (J.B.S.) 

Recipients of the Companion of the Most Exalted Order of the Star of Sarawak (J.B.S.) include:-
 The Late Datuk Marcus Raja - 2004 (Posthumous)
 The Late Lawrence Th’ng Kok Kuang - 2004 (Posthumous)
 Datin Judith Satem Nee Palmer - 2004
 Dr Chou Chii Ming - 2004
 Jelaing Mersat, Malaysian Deputy Minister of Home Affairs - 2009
 Abang Mohamad Atei Abang Medaan, Mayor of Kuching North - 2009
 James Chan Khay Syn, Mayor of Kuching South - 2009
 Mohd. Amin Hassan, Executive Committee Member, Sarawak United National Youth Organisation (SABERKAS) - 2009
 Mohamed Ali Mohamed Sheriff - 2009
 Abang Amir Abang Latip - 2009
 Dayang Madinah Tun Abang Haji Openg - 2009
 Haw Min @ Chiew Min Wai, Penghulu for Niah - 2016
 Ting Hua Sing, treasurer, Sarawak Progressive Democratic Party (SPDP) - 2016

Pegawai Bintang Sarawak (P.B.S.) 

Recipients of the Officer of the Most Exalted Order of the Star of Sarawak (P.B.S.) include:-
 Pemanca Sahari Gani - 2015
 Tan Hock Heng - 2015
 Bibi Macpherson@McPherson - 1999

Ahli Bintang Sarawak (A.B.S.) 

 Douglas Uggah Embas, Political Secretary to the Chief Minister of Sarawak - 1985
 Koh Ek Chong, Councillor, Miri City Council - 2008
 Julie Ting Chek Ho - 2021

Bentara Bintang Sarawak (B.B.S.) 

 Douglas Uggah Embas, Political Secretary to the Chief Minister of Sarawak - 1984

Notes

References

External links 

 Photos of the Sarawak State Orders, Decorations and Medals

 
Star of Sarawak, Most Exalted Order